The Panel Study of Income Dynamics (PSID) is a longitudinal panel survey of American families, conducted by the Survey Research Center at the University of Michigan.

The PSID measures economic, social, and health factors over the life course of families over multiple generations. Data have been collected from the same families and their descendants since 1968. It has been claimed that it is the world’s longest running household panel survey.

Background
The PSID gathers data about the circumstances of the family as a whole and about each individual in the family. The greatest level of detail is gathered for the primary adult(s) heading the family. The PSID has achieved high and consistent response rates, and because of low attrition and the success in following young adults as they form their own families, the sample size has grown from 4,800 families in 1968, to 7,000 families in 2001, to 7,400 by 2005, and to more than 9,000 as of 2013. By 2003, the PSID had collected information on more than 65,000 individuals. As of 2013, the PSID had information on over 75,000 individuals, spanning as many as 4 decades of their lives.

Framework
The structure of the PSID started with two distinct samples. A nationally representative sample designed by the Survey Research Center became known as the SRC sample. A second sample of individuals was drawn from lower income levels, and this became known as the Survey of Economic Opportunity (SEO) sample. This second sample, though not nationally representative, allowed for more studies to investigate poverty in the United States. After this initial 1968 interview, families were interviewed each year until 1997. After 1997, the survey has been biennial, with data being collected every two years. Over time, as individuals leave their household, they are followed as they form their new residence. As time passed, the representativeness of the original sample became more and more out of line with the overall US demographic. To ameliorate the potential bias, two additional samples were added to the PSID. A third sample consisting of Latinos was added. In 1997, a new fourth Immigrant sample was added, and the other three reorganized. All three continued to be collected, but with a reduced number of households. The two "core" samples (SRC and SEO) were reduced to include 6,168 families, and the Latino sample was reduced to 2000 families. To these, a new set of 441 families from the Immigrant sample created a study group capable of tracking the current demographics in the US.

Until 1972, interviews were done in person using paper. Since 1973 interviews are by phone. Starting in 1993, interviews were conducted using Computer Assisted Telephone (CAT) technology.

Child Development Supplement 
The Child Development Supplement (CDS) is a research component of the PSID. The CDS provides researchers with extensive data on children and their extended families with which to study the dynamic process of early human and social capital formation. The first CDS study included up to two children per household who were 0 to 12 years old in 1997, and followed those children over three waves, ending in 2007-08. The CDS 2014 includes all eligible children in PSID households born since 1997.

Transition into Adulthood Supplement 
When children in the CDS cohort reach 18 years of age, information is obtained about their circumstances through a telephone interview completed shortly after the Main Interview. This study, called Transition into Adulthood Supplement, has been implemented in 2005, and biennially thereafter. Information includes measures of time use, psychological functioning, marriage, family, responsibilities, employment and income, education and career goals, health, social environment, religiosity, and outlook on life.

File structure of the PSID 
The PSID's information is held in many files. The main head and wife responses are held in a series of "Family Files" that are uniquely identified by a Family ID number. A smaller subset of information pertaining to individuals (whether they are a head, wife, or other family unit members) is contained in the cross-year individual file, and each record is uniquely identified by a 1968 Family ID and Person Number pair. Many additional supplemental files are available with supplemental information that may have been collected for only one or a few years.

Topical information 
The PSID collects data on a wide array of social, demographic, health, economic, geospatial and psychological data. As of 2009, the 75 minute interview collected data on:
 employment
 earnings
 income from all sources
 expenditures covering 100% of total household spending
 transfers
 housing
 education
 geospatial data
 health status
 health behaviors
 health insurance
 early childhood and adult health conditions and their timing
 emotional well-being
 life satisfaction
 mortality and cause of death
 marriage and fertility
 participation in government programs
 financial distress including problems paying debt such as mortgages and foreclosure
 vehicle ownership
 wealth
 pensions, and
 philanthropy.
Many of these areas have been included in the instrument since 1968. Hundreds of additional variables that fall into other domains have been collected in various waves throughout the history of the PSID. No identifying information is distributed to data users and the identity of all respondents is held in confidence.

Approximately 3,200 peer-reviewed publications – one every 2.5 days – are based on PSID data published in the fields of economics, sociology, demography, psychology, child development, public health, medicine, education, communications, and others. The PSID was named one of the National Science Foundation's "Sensational Sixty," NSF-funded inventions, innovations and discoveries that have become commonplace in American lives.

Researchers and funding 
The main source of support for the study comes from the National Science Foundation, the National Institute on Aging and the National Institute of Child Health and Human Development. There are other important sponsors of the study as well including the Office of the Assistant Secretary for Planning and Evaluation of the United States Department of Health and Human Services, the Economic Research Service of the United States Department of Agriculture, the United States Department of Housing and Urban Development and the Center on Philanthropy at Indiana University.

See also 
 List of household surveys in the United States
The PSID has sister surveys conducted in other countries, including:
 German Socio-Economic Panel (SOEP), housed at the German Institute for Economic Research (DIW) Berlin
 British Household Panel Survey (BHPS) conducted by investigators at the University of Essex and now merging with the UK households: a longitudinal study
 Household, Income and Labour Dynamics in Australia Survey (HILDA)
 Italian Survey on Household Income and Wealth (SHIW)

References

External links 
 Panel Study of Income Dynamics
Cross National Equivalent File (CNEF) (URL accessed 2016-01-28)

Economic data
University of Michigan
Panel data
1968 establishments in Michigan
Household surveys